Paddy O'Donoghue was a selector for the Dublin senior football team, along with Mickey Whelan, for former manager Pat Gilroy. He was formerly a player for both his county team (Dublin) and his club Kilmacud Crokes.

He won two Dublin Senior Football Championship medals with Kilmacud Crokes in 1994 and again in 1995. He also won two Leinster Senior Club Football Championship medals with Crokes in 1994 and 1995. He won an All-Ireland Senior Club Football Championship medal with Crokes in 1995; in the final, he was awarded the man of the match award. He also captained Trinity College Dublin to their first Ryan Cup in the 1998/89 season. He played with Dublin during the early nineties.

Prior to his appointment as Dublin selector, O'Donoghue  was the manager of the Kilmacud Crokes minor football team.

References

Year of birth missing (living people)
Living people
Dublin inter-county Gaelic footballers
Gaelic football managers
Gaelic football selectors
Kilmacud Crokes Gaelic footballers
Place of birth missing (living people)